Taz Russky is a rural locality (a selo) in Klyapovskoye Rural Settlement, Beryozovsky District, Perm Krai, Russia. The population was 175 as of 2010. There are 6 streets.

Geography 
It is located on the Taz River, 13 km southeast of  Beryozovka (the district's administrative centre) by road. Taz Tatarsky is the nearest rural locality.

References 

Rural localities in Beryozovsky District, Perm Krai